Soro is a city and a municipality in Balasore district in the Indian state of Odisha. It is about 181 km from the capital of the state Bhubaneswar and 35 km from the district headquarters Balasore. Located on NH-16, the city is located midway between Balasore and Bhadrak cities. Soro along with neighboring cities  contributes significantly towards the economy of Balasore district.

Geography

It has an average elevation of 3 metres (9 feet). The Bay Of Bengal is just about 20 km from the town. The scenic beauty of the hills of Deva Giri and Panchalingeswar stands just 5–7 km from the town. The river Kansabansa flows to the south of the town. Soro is surrounded by Simulia tahasil, Khaira tahasil, Bahanaga tahasil. Land is very fertile for growing crops, especially rice.

Economy
(Odia) ସୋରୋ Soro is booming nowadays in terms of trade/ business. It has no fewer than 5,000 shops. So many other small markets and businessman are dependent on this market. Soro has two business areai.e. Adang bazar and Uttareswar. Mainly these markets are popular for their business transaction.
The Soro market is famous for its fresh Hilsa Fishes and farm vegetables sold by the local community from nearby villages. Grocery whole selling business, Cloth whole selling on which nearby villages are dependent on soro. It has various shopping malls which are SNV Shoppe, Reliance Smart Point, Reliance Trendz, Lifestyle, Super Bazar, P-lounge Store etc

Civic administration and utilities 
The Soro Municipality oversees and manages civic infrastructure for the town's 19 wards. Residents of each ward elect a councillor to the Soro Municipality  for a five-year term. Standing committees handle urban planning and maintain roads, government-aided schools, hospitals and municipal markets. As Soro's apex body, the Municipality discharges its functions through the council, which comprises a Chairperson, a Vice Chairperson and other elected members. The executive wing is headed by an executive officer. Soro Municipality's responsibilities include drainage and sewerage, sanitation, solid waste management and street lighting. As of 2013, the INC controlled the Soro Municipality; the Chairperson was Subhasmita Mohanty 

Soro has lower courts: The Civil Court decide civil matters; the JFM Court rules in criminal cases.

Soro Police, a state police force with primary responsibilities in law enforcement and investigation in Soro area.

Citizens of Soro elect  representative to India's lower house, the Lok Sabha as a part of Bhadrak (Lok Sabha constituency), and one representative to the state legislative assembly, through the constituency of Soro..

Education
Soro town contains 5 colleges and 6 high schools and about 20 M.E. schools which spread the light of education not only in the town but in the surrounding areas also.
Upendra Nath College ( http://www.uncollegesoro.com) is the premier college of the town which holds the dignity of being the best college in the locality as well as among the colleges affiliated to F.M.University. It is located by the N.H.-5.
Soro women's college, situated near Idga Maidan (court chhak) is the only college offering higher education for girls.
Both the college have two wings viz. +2 and +3.
A centre of Odisha State Open University (OSOU) has been established in the town.

Schools
Radhanath Bidyapitha and Satyananda High school are the two schools that have received recognition in state level for their performance matriculation results that include board rank holders.

Jawahar Navodaya Vidyalaya, Bagudi  (also known as JNV Bagudi or JNV Balasore) is a public residential school in Bagudi village (near Mangalpur) of (Odia) ସୋରୋ Soro block in the Balasore district. Government-run, it provides education to children predominantly from the rural areas and economically challenged families. It was established and is managed by Navodaya Vidyalaya Samiti (an autonomous organization of the Ministry of Human Resource Development and Department of Secondary Education and Higher Education). In accordance with the National Policy on Education (1986) of the government of India, the Jawahar Navodaya Vidyalaya Bagudi in the Balasore district was established during March 1987.

Transport

Private operators run buses connecting Soro to cities in Odisha and with the neighbouring states of Jharkhand, West Bengal . Soro is connected to the rest of Odisha and India by National Highways-NH 16, which is a part of the Kolkata-Chennai prong of the Golden Quadrilateral.

Road
Soro has good network of Municipal and PWD roads.  Auto rickshaws are available for hire and on a share basis throughout the town. In parts of the town, cycle rickshaws offer short trips. To ease traffic jams, over-bridges at major road junctions and expansion of roads are under construction.

Rail
Soro is a part of South Eastern Railway zone and is connected to major cities by daily express and passenger trains, but daily service to all metro cities is not available from here. Currently, the station has four platforms. There are plans to add two more platforms.

Politics
Soro is one of the Vidhan Sabha seat of Odisha. Current MLA from Soro Assembly Constituency is Mr.Parshuram Dhada of BJD, who won the seat in State elections in 2014 and 2019.

References

Cities and towns in Balasore district